The SS Drexel Victory was a Victory-class cargo ship built during World War II. The SS Drexel Victory (MCV-712), was a type VC2-S-AP2 victory ship built by Permanente Metals Corporation, Yard 2, of Richmond, California under the Emergency Shipbuilding program. The Maritime Administration cargo ship was the 744th victory ship. Her keel was laid on February 25, 1945. The ship was christened on May 2, 1945. The ship was named in honor of Drexel University in Philadelphia, one of 150 educational institutions that had Victory ships named after them.

Victory ships were designed to replace the earlier Liberty Ships. Liberty ships were designed to be used just for WW2. Victory ships were designed to last longer and serve the US Navy after the war. The Victory ship differed from a Liberty ship in that they were: faster, longer and wider, taller, a thinner stack set farther toward the superstructure and had a long raised forecastle.

Drexel Victory had difficulty from the start, on May 2, 1945, the not yet complete SS Drexel Victory side-swiped the waterfront loading dock of the Ford plant as she was being moved by tugboats from Kaiser's Richmond shipyard no. 2. The damage stopped work at the Richmond Tank Depot as the gantry crane that served the Ford dock was damaged. As the gantry crane fell it damaged the brick wall of the Ford Motor Company Assembly Plant. The wall fell on an interior overhead crane. The falling debris damaged five military vehicles near the crane and wall.

Drexel Victory did not see combat action as the war was near the end by the time she was completed. She was laid down on February 25, 1945, during the time World War II was still active in the Pacific War. But, with the surrender of Japan on 15 August 1945, she was not needed to help with the bloody invasion of Japan's mainland.  She was operated by Oliver J. Olson & Company as a United States Merchant Marine ship and helped bring supplies home and take supplies to help war-torn Pacific nations under the Marshall plan. 
 
On September 26, 1946, the Drexel Victory ran aground in Tokyo Bay near Fort No. 2. The SS Protector helped pull the Drexel Victory free.

Drexel Victory departed Portland, Oregon, for Yokohama, Japan on January 20, 1947. As part of Marshall plan she was loaded with more than 5,000 tons of grain. As she streamed down the Columbia River, she struck the Columbia Bar hard and began breaking up between in her middle, between cargo holds 4 and 5. Captain Canute Rommerdahl was operating the ship for Olson & Company under the U.S. Maritime Commission. What the Drexel Victory  hit is still a mystery as the charts for the area she hit recorded the channel at 57 feet deep. Drexel Victory water line was only at a depth of 30 feet. But, shifting sand bars are known to happen anytime. A large swell could have put her on a bar. She may have struck a submerged shipwreck. She lays at about 210 feet under the surface water at Latitude: 46.31232. Longitude: -124.1596. The Drexel Victory was abandoned without loss of life in the fog and darkness. The US Coast Guard reported the ship sank at 3:35 am. The lifeboats were lowered, and the crew of 30 loaded boarded as the ship started to break up. The US Coast Guard picked up the crew 2 hours later with the ship . The crew and lifeboats were found near the SS Columbia by a river pilot schooner. Columbia river pilots ship program started in 1846, to help ships safety cross the treacherous Columbia River Bar. The Liberty ship SS Joseph Gale picked up some of the crew before the US Coast Guard ship arrived.

References

1945 ships
World War II merchant ships of the United States
Ships built in Richmond, California
Drexel University